Boysie Oakes is fictional secret agent created by the British spy novelist John Gardner in 1964 at the height of a period of fictional spy mania.

Character Biography
Oakes is mistakenly recruited into a British spy agency despite being a coward who wants to be left alone. He features in eight novels over an 11 year period and eventually becomes the head of the agency.

Film
The first novel in the series, The Liquidator, was made into a feature film of the same name in 1965, starring Rod Taylor as Boysie Oakes.

Boysie Oakes novels
The Liquidator (1964)
Understrike (1965)
Amber Nine (1966)
Madrigal (1967)
Founder Member (1969)
Traitor's Exit (1970)
The Airline Pirates (1970) - published in the U.S. as Air Apparent
A Killer for a Song (1975)

Two Boysie Oakes short stories appear in Hideaway (1968): A Handful of Rice, and Corkscrew.

Two Boysie Oakes short stories appear in The Assassination File (1974): Boysie Oakes and The Explosive Device, Sunset At Paleokastritsa.

External links
 

Oakes, Boysie
Series of books